Jasenov is a village and municipality in the Sobrance District in the Košice Region of east Slovakia.

History
In historical records the village was first mentioned in 1279.

Geography
The village lies at an altitude of 174 metres and covers an area of 7.213 km².
It has a population of 314 people (2005).

Facilities
The village has a public library, and a football pitch.

See also
 List of municipalities and towns in Slovakia

References

Genealogical resources

The records for genealogical research are available at the state archive "Statny Archiv in Presov, Slovakia"
 Greek Catholic church records (births/marriages/deaths): 1880–1919 (parish A)

External links
 
 https://web.archive.org/web/20070513023228/http://www.statistics.sk/mosmis/eng/run.html
 https://web.archive.org/web/20160328003421/http://en.e-obce.sk/obec/jasenov-kosice/jasenov.html
 http://www.obecjasenov.sk
 Surnames of living people in Jasenov

Villages and municipalities in Sobrance District